Karen Robertson (born 19 July 1961) is a Hong Kong former freestyle swimmer. She competed in two events at the 1976 Summer Olympics.

References

External links
 

1961 births
Living people
Hong Kong female freestyle swimmers
Olympic swimmers of Hong Kong
People educated at Island School
Swimmers at the 1976 Summer Olympics
Commonwealth Games competitors for Hong Kong
Swimmers at the 1978 Commonwealth Games
Place of birth missing (living people)